Hussein Sadiq al Musrati is the former Libyan Ambassador to China.

On 20 February 2011, during a live on-air interview with Al Jazeera about the 2011 Libyan civil war, al Musrati resigned in support of the protesters. During his resignation, he compared Muammar Gaddafi to Adolf Hitler and stated that all diplomatic staff should resign in protest against Gaddafi.

References 

Libyan diplomats
Living people
Ambassadors of Libya to China
People of the First Libyan Civil War
Year of birth missing (living people)